GA Peach is the third studio album by the American rapper Rasheeda. It was released on April 25, 2006. The album was released after Rasheeda's four-year career hiatus. The album is considered her "comeback" album, because although it was unsuccessful, it helped her to "bounce back" from the failure of her second album. The lead single, "Georgia Peach" was mildly successful, but the second and third singles were very unsuccessful. The album also showed a sexier side of Rasheeda than her first two albums with a heavier focus on songs geared for the nightclubs. The album is also Rasheeda's second independently released album and her sole release on Big Cat Records.

Background
Frost's first two albums were very unsuccessful, so she decided to take a break from her career. In early 2005, Rasheeda began to look for a new label, and she signed a dual contract with D-Lo Entertainment and Big Cat Records. In late 2005, she began work on her third studio album, and aimed to show a sexier side of herself, with more crunk, uptempo, and dance oriented tracks as she had matured from the girl that everyone knew from her first two albums.

Singles
 "Georgia Peach" was released as the lead single from the album on March 14, 2006. No music video was produced for the single, which was mildly successful. It only reached #89 on the US R&B/Hip-Hop Songs chart.
 "Touch Ya Toes" was released as the second single from the album on July 25, 2006. No music video was produced for the single, and it failed to chart.
 "Got That Good (My Bubble Gum)" was released as the third and final single from the album on November 7, 2006.

Sales and chart performance
The album debuted at #81 on the Billboard 200.

Track listing
 "Georgia Peach"
 "You Can Get It"
 "Touch Ya Toes"
 "Don't Hate" (featuring Jody Breeze)
 "Buy My Drink"
 "See Me Naked" (with Jasper)
 "Pack Ya Bags" (featuring Kalenna Harper)
 "Type a Girl"
 "Lifestyle" (featuring Gangsta Boo, Diamond and Princess of Crime Mob)
 "Every Rapper Can't Trap"
 "Let It Clap" (featuring Akon)
 "Chanel Shades"
 "Bring It to Mamma" (mislabelled as "Bring It Mamma" on back cover, but is correct in booklet)
 "Hold Whatcha Got"
 "Who Can Love You...?"
 "Got That Good (My Bubble Gum)"
 "Poppin Bottles" (Bonus Track) (featuring Pastor Troy)

Unreleased tracks

"Rocked Away" (featuring Lil Scrappy)
"Let's Get This Money" (featuring Young Jeezy)
"Give Ya Whatcha Want" (featuring Kalenna Harper)
"Head-n-Choose"
"I'm The Game"
"What It Hit For"
"She Fire" (featuring Pierre and Tibarrus)

External links
 Official website

2006 albums
Rasheeda albums